Tango is a social dance form including Argentine, Uruguayan, and international ballroom tango.

Tango may also refer to:

Arts, entertainment, and media

Dance
Tango (Balanchine), a ballet by George Balanchine based on a Stravinsky composition
Tango (Martins), a ballet by Peter Martins based on a Stravinsky composition
Maxixe (dance), also known as "Brazilian tango"

Films 
¡Tango! (1933 film), a film by Argentine director Luis Moglia Barth
Tango (1933 film), a film by Danish director George Schnéevoigt
Tango (1936 film), a film by Phil Rosen
Tango (1969 film), a 1969 Bulgarian film
Tango (1981 film), an animated film by Polish director Zbigniew Rybczyński
Tango (1993 film), a film by French director Patrice Leconte
Tango (1998 film), a film by Spanish director Carlos Saura

Music and dance

Genres and styles
Tango music, a genre of music that originated in Argentina and Uruguay
Tango (flamenco), a song-form or instrumental-form of flamenco music

Albums
Tango (Julio Iglesias album), 1996
Tango (Patty Larkin album), 1991
Tango (Negative album), 2004
Tango (Sonia & Disappear Fear album), 2007
Tango (Tanguito album), recorded in 1970 and released posthumously in 1973

Compositions
"Tango" (Stravinsky), a 1940 piece by Russian composer Igor Stravinsky

Songs
"Tango" (Jaci Velasquez song), a song on the 2008 album Love Out Loud 
"Tango" (Tananai song), a song on the 2023 album Rave, eclissi 
"Tango", a song on the 2006 album Public Warning by Lady Sovereign
"Tango", a song on the 2004 album Tango by Negative

Television
Tango (telecom), a mobile telephone operator in Luxembourg and Liechtenstein
T.TV, a television channel in Luxembourg formerly known as Tango TV
TV6 (Lithuania), also known as Tango TV in Lithuania

Other uses in arts, entertainment, and media
Tango (comics), a comics anthology published in Australia since 1997
Tango (novel), a 1989 novel by Alan Judd
Tango (play), a 1964 play by Sławomir Mrożek
Tango (ride), a type of amusement ride
Tango Magazine, an American magazine for adult women under 40
Tango Desktop Project (stylized Tango!), which set standards for computer icons

Military 
Tango (boat), also known as the Armored Troop Carrier, used in the Vietnam War
Command Post TANGO, a U.S. military installation in South Korea
Russian battleship Poltava (1894), sunk by the Japanese, raised and renamed Tango
Tango-class submarine, the NATO code name for a Russian submarine class

People 
Tango McCauley (born 1978), American gridiron football player
Egisto Tango (1873–1951), Italian conductor
Hiromi Tango (born 1976), Japanese installation and performance artist
Tom Tango, pseudonym of a Canadian sabermetrician residing in USA
Tanguito (1945–1972), a.k.a. Tango, Argentine singer-songwriter
Virginia Tango Piatti (1869–1958), Italian writer and pacifist

Places 
Tango, a neighborhood in Glan, Sarangani, Philippines
Tango Monastery, near Thimphu, Bhutan
Tango Province, Japan, an old province in today's northern Kyoto Prefecture
Tangov (also spelled Tango), Azerbaijan, a village

Software 
Tango (application), a video-messaging application software
Tango (platform), augmented reality computing platform developed and authored by Google
Tango (D library), an alternative to the Phobos standard library
TANGO, a CORBA+ZMQ based control system 
Dalim Tango, Dalim's product for colour retouching during the 1990s
Tango controls, a CORBA+ZMQ based control system 
Tango Desktop Project
Tango PCB and Tango Schematic, early Computer-aided engineering programs

Transport 
 Tango (tram), a tram type produced by Stadler Rail
 Air Canada Tango, a defunct low-cost airline launched by Air Canada
 Commuter Cars Tango, an electric vehicle manufactured in Spokane, Washington, U.S.
 Paraavis Tango, a Russian paraglider design
 Paraavis Tango Duett, a Russian paraglider design
 SEAT Tango, a roadster concept car built by the Spanish car maker SEAT
 SS Tango, a floating casino located off of Southern California from the late 1930s to the late 1940s, run by mobster Anthony Cornero

Other uses 
Tango (drink), a soft drink manufactured in the United Kingdom
Tango (mythology), the third child of the primordial mother goddess Varima-te-takere
Tango, a satellite as part of the Prisma (satellite project) owned by the Swedish Space Corporation 
Tango, also known as Cluster 4, an ESA satellite in the Cluster II mission
Tango, the letter T in the NATO phonetic alphabet
Adidas Tango, a type of football designed by Adidas

See also 

Tanga (disambiguation)
Tangos (disambiguation)